The Central District of Parsabad County is in Ardabil province, Iran. At the 2006 census, its population was 122,923 in 26,307 households. The following census in 2011 counted 131,395 people in 33,857 households. At the latest census in 2016, the district had 118,144 inhabitants living in 33,527 households.

References 

Parsabad County

Districts of Ardabil Province

Populated places in Ardabil Province

Populated places in Parsabad County